The Gijón International Film Festival ( or FICXixón) is an annual film festival held in Gijón, a city in northwest Spain.

History 
The festival's origins date back to 1963. In the beginning it was an initiative of the City Council of Gijón in co-operation with Caja de Ahorros de Asturias (Cajastur). Both entities co-operate with the Festival, the first as organizer and the second as sponsor.

The first year it was held it was called Certamen Internacional de Cine y TV Infantil (International Children's cinema and TV contest). Between 1964 and 1968 it still kept the same name, only the last part, “children's”, was substituted by “for children”. Between 1969 and 1976 this last part stopped appearing in the Festival's name. From 1977 till 1978 it received the name Certamen Internacional de Cine para la Infancia y la Juventud (International Cinema Contest for Children and Teens). Although in 1986 the Festival began to put the text Gijón International Film Festival in front of its name, it was not until 1988 that it officially adopted this name. Every year the Festival appoints a Young Jury made up of teens between 17 and 25 years among those, who request it.

The present director, Alejandro Díaz Castaño, was elected in 2017 after a public tender to replace Nacho Carballo. In May 1996 the Entidad Mercantil Artístico-Musical Teatro Municipal Jovellanos de Gijón, S.A., body in charge of the organization of the event together with the City Council, was founded, and changed its name later into Divertia S.A.. This institution is in charge of the theatre's running, the festivities department and the organization of the Film Festival.

Throughout the years, some of the most prestigious professionals in independent filmmaking have attended the festival, such as Abbas Kiarostami, Aki Kaurismäki, Todd Haynes, Pedro Costa, Paul Schrader, João César Monteiro, Seijun Suzuki, Jem Cohen, Kenneth Anger, Ulrich Seidl, Hal Hartley, Lukas Moodysson, Tsai Ming-liang, Claire Denis, Todd Solondz, Bertrand Bonello, Apichatpong Weerasethakul, Whit Stillman, Eugène Green or Philippe Garrel.

Among the festival's national and international guests, either as members of the International Jury or presenting their films in the various sections of the festival, are John Cale, Maria Schneider, Monte Hellman, Nicolas Winding Refn, Darren Aronofsky, Víctor Erice, Isabel Coixet or Carla Simón.

Gijón International Film Festival comprises also a series of events, such as courses, panel discussions, q&a's and daily concerts, as well as live music parties. Since 2017, it organizes a series of activities for professionals, under the name of FICX Industry Days.

The festival awards various prizes in its competitive sections and collaborates in other initiatives with an aim to promote Asturian filmmaking industry. Said awards are decided upon by an International Jury (made up of at least 5 professionals from different countries), a Young Jury (50 young people between 17 and 26 years of age) and, since 2005, a FIPRESCI jury.

Nacho Martínez award

The Gijón International Film Festival granted a National Film Award named after 'Nacho Martínez', since 2002 to people who have contributed significantly to the film industry. It is a unique sculpture made by Jaime Herrero.

 2002, Juan Echanove, actor
 2003, Gonzalo Suárez, director
 2004, Eusebio Poncela, actor
 2005, Assumpta Serna, actress, she co-starred with him in Matador
 2006, Maribel Verdú actress
 2007, Marisa Paredes
 2008, Mercedes Sampietro, actress
 2009, Ángela Molina actress
 2010, Charo López actress
 2011, Montxo Armendáriz, film director and screenwriter
 2012, Luis San Narciso, artistic director 
 2013, Carmelo Gómez, actor
 2014, Imanol Arias, actor
 2015, José Sacristán, actor
 2016, Lluís Homar, actor and theater director
 2017, Verónica Forqué, actress

References

External links
 Official site

Film festivals in Spain
Asturian culture
Gijón
Tourist attractions in Asturias